The Indian locomotive class WAG-11 is a class of twin-section 25 kV AC electric locomotives that was developed in 2018 by Banaras Locomotive Works (BLW), Varanasi for Indian Railways. The model name stands for broad gauge (W), Alternating Current (A), Goods traffic (G), and 11th in series (11). They entered trials service in 2019. A total of 4 WAG-11 pairs have been built by Banaras Locomotive Works (BLW), Varanasi.

As of January 2023, 4 locomotives are built and are undergoing "testing", with further examples being converted from WDG-4 to WAG-11.

History 
The history of WAG-11 begins in the early 2017 with the stated aim of the Indian Railways to minimize the dependence on diesel locomotives in Indian Railways after recommendation of Cabinet Committee on Economic Affairs (CCEA). The committee recommended that Expansion of electrified routes across the country will also help in reducing energy cost. Therefore, a large number of WDG-4 diesel locomotives would become surplus after full electrification. Thus Indian Railways decided to convert existing WDG-4 locomotives which needed midlife overhaul into the WAG-11 electric locomotive class.

The same old GT46MAC (WDG-4)  traction motors are being used for WAG11. The locomotives had GTO propulsion, a few parts can not be leveraged for the rebuilt to IGBT technology. However, since the power supply now comes from the WAG9 transformer / control, ABB has been updating its WAG9 control software for the EMD 3 phase traction motors for best results.  As a result, the diesel power pack of the locomotive will be decommissioned and used as spare parts for interim use since there are still 150+ more GTO WDG-4 in use.

The First WAG-11 unit was allocated TKD for trials and performance monitoring. They are fitted with high rise pantographs and have regenerative braking. After initial testing another unit was built and these 2 locomotives were transferred to Bondamuda (BNDM) for examining working conditions hauling heavy load goods trains. The third prototype 29003 came out of DLW shop but this one is different from the previous two because both the locos have twin cabs and twin pantographs. It looks like they can be separately operated like any regular WAG-9. Also the height and construct of these two locos are extremely similar to WAG9s.

Difference 
There are quite a few differences between the two earlier prototypes of WAG11 and 29003. They are in the following lines:

 Instead of an articulated design, DLW made both locos as twin cab locos (they may be able to independently operated after decoupling)
 Two pantographs each on both the locos - making is 4 pantographs for 29003 unit
 The loco shell is placed at the same height as a WAP7/WAG9 and is carefully covering the chassis. In earlier versions, the EMD chassis / under-frame was used and was visible. 29003 almost looks like it is made on WAG9 chassis / under-frame and EMD bogies/traction motors have been used.
 The cow-catcher is new and of typical WAP7/WAG9 net design. The solid EMD cowcatcher has been discontinued.
 On top of the cabs, either a dynamic brake radiator or rooftop AC has been installed.

Units

For Conversion 
Railway Board sent a circular to identify 16 WDG-4 locos that would be converted to WAG-11 during the financial year 2020–2021.

Locomotive shed

See also

 Rail transport in India#History
 Locomotives of India
 Rail transport in India
Indian locomotive class WDG-4

References

Notes

Bibliography

Electric locomotives of India
25 kV AC locomotives
Banaras Locomotive Works locomotives
Co-Co locomotives
Railway locomotives introduced in 2019
5 ft 6 in gauge locomotives